Antonio Dontral Banks (born March 12, 1973) is an American football coach and former cornerback in the National Football League (NFL) with the Minnesota Vikings. Banks is currently the defensive backs coach for IMG Academy.

Playing career
Banks played college football at Virginia Tech where he was a letterman for all four years between 1993 and 1996 and was MVP of the 1993 Independence Bowl. He was drafted in the fourth round of the 1997 NFL Draft 113th overall by the Minnesota Vikings where he played for four seasons. Banks also had several stints with multiple teams in NFL Europe and the Canadian Football League in his professional career.

Coaching career
In 2006, Banks was the head coach of the Alphen aan den Rijn, Netherlands based Alphen Eagles of the European Football League. Later, he was hired as head coach of the Cairo Bears of the Egyptian Federation of American football in 2016. He joined IMG Academy in 2017 as the Defensive Back coach for their high school football program.

References

1973 births
Living people
American football defensive backs
American players of Canadian football
Canadian football defensive backs
Amsterdam Admirals players
Frankfurt Galaxy players
Minnesota Vikings players
Montreal Alouettes players
Virginia Tech Hokies football players
Winnipeg Blue Bombers players
High school football coaches in Florida
People from Southampton County, Virginia
Players of American football from Virginia
African-American coaches of American football
African-American players of American football
21st-century African-American sportspeople
20th-century African-American sportspeople
American expatriate sportspeople in the Netherlands
American expatriate players of American football
American expatriate sportspeople in Germany
American expatriate sportspeople in Egypt
Coaches of American football from Virginia